The 2022 Arizona Wildcats baseball team represented the University of Arizona during the 2022 NCAA Division I baseball season. The Wildcats played their home games for the 11th season at Hi Corbett Field. The team was coached by Chip Hale in his 1st season at Arizona. Previous head coach Jay Johnson - who had been with the program for 6 seasons - was hired during the offseason as the head coach at LSU, filling the vacancy left by the retirement of Paul Mainieri. The Wildcats finished 5th in the Pac-12, but were selected into the NCAA Tournament for the 2nd straight year for the first time since 2016–17. The Wildcats lost to Ole Miss in the regional final of the Coral Gables Regional.

Previous season 
The Wildcats finished the 2021 season with a record of 45–18 (21–9 Conf.), making a run to the College World Series for the first time since 2016. They would eventually be eliminated in two games after losing consecutive games to Vanderbilt and Stanford. For the first time since 2012 (when the Wildcats last won the College World Series), Hi Corbett Field was selected as both a NCAA postseason Regional and Super Regional site. The Wildcats also won their first Pac-12 Conference championship since the 2012 season, and their first outright conference championship since 1989.

Personnel

Roster

Coaches

Opening day

Schedule and results

Coral Gables Regional

2022 MLB draft

References 

Arizona Wildcats baseball
Arizona Wildcats baseball seasons
Arizona Wildcats
Wildcats